Chandigarh College of Engineering and Technology (CCET) is one of the top finest Government engineering college which is an affiliated college of the Panjab University. CCET, formerly known as Central Polytechnic Chandigarh (CPC), was established in 1959. The Chandigarh Administration upgraded the CPC to CCET, by then Administrator Lt. Gn. JFR Jacob, by introducing two branches of engineering in 2002. It is the only technical college offering both Diploma and Degree qualifications in Chandigarh.

Campus 

The campus is divided into zones like administration blocks for Degree and Diploma stream, and hostels and residential complex for faculty and staff.

In addition to lecture halls, tutorial rooms and drawing halls, the college has an auditorium, library, computer centers, workshops, laboratories and playgrounds. The college has a branch of State Bank of India with ATM facility, extension counter of Post Office and a canteen. The campus has a unit of the National Cadet Corps (NCC).

The college is under the administrative control of the Directorate of Technical Education, Chandigarh Administration for its degree courses and Punjab State Board of Technical Education and Industrial Training for its Diploma courses.

Degree Wing 

The following are the courses available under the 4 year degree program (number of seats in brackets):
Civil Engineering (66)
Computer Science and Engineering (66)
Electronics and Communication Engineering (66)
Mechanical Engineering (66)

Diploma Wing 

The following are the courses available in Diploma (number of seats in brackets):
Architectural Assistantship (30)
Civil Engineering (40)
Computer Engineering (30)
Electrical Engineering (50)
Electronics and Communication Engineering (30)
Mechanical Engineering (60)
Production and Industrial Engineering (30)

The institution provides services to the residents of Chandigarh by offering courses from 7am to 9:15pm, as follows:
 Diploma courses (regular).
 Part Time Diploma (for employed students).
 Formal Diploma courses under PWD Scheme.
 Non formal Diploma courses under PWD Scheme.
 Modular Employable Skills (MES) under SDI Scheme.

References

External links
 Official website

All India Council for Technical Education
Educational institutions established in 2002
Engineering colleges in Punjab, India
Engineering colleges in Chandigarh